Muhammad Rafli (born 24 November 1998) is an Indonesian professional footballer who plays for Liga 1 club Arema, and the Indonesia national team. A versatile player, Rafli plays as a midfielder or forward, and has been deployed in a variety of attacking roles – as an attacking midfielder, second striker, centre forward and on either wing. Rafli began to be known when he was selected in 2016 to attend the now-defunct Nike Academy, a program run by Nike Inc. for selected under-20 players scouted worldwide known as 'Nike Most Wanted' players. The only other Indonesian who participated in this academy was the national team's current playmaker Evan Dimas, in 2012.

Club career

Early career 
He began to pursue soccer by entering the Aji Santoso International Football Academy (ASIFA) in his hometown of Malang. ASIFA, founded by former national team captain and coach Aji Santoso, is a feeder for Arema F.C. and other professional teams in East Java.

Arema FC 
Rafli signed his first professional contract with Arema F.C. in January 2017. Rafli made his Arema debut on 23 April 2017 in a Liga 1 match against Bhayangkara in a 2–0 home win. He scored his first league goal on 2 October 2019. It was the first goal in a 0–2 victory against PSM Makassar in the Liga 1. On 16 December 2019, he scored in a 3–2 win over Bali United.

On 3 October 2021, Rafli scored his first goal of the 2021–22 season, scoring from the free-kick in the 34th minute, final result, Arema win 3–0 over Persela Lamongan in the 2021–22 Liga 1. On 23 October, he scored the opening goal with scoring from the free-kick in the 4th minute, final result, Arema win 2–0 over Persiraja Banda Aceh. On 6 November, he scored in a Super East Java Derby against Persebaya Surabaya, final result, Arema draw 2–2.

International career
Rafli made his international debut for Indonesia U-19 on 14 September 2016 against Thailand U-19.  and he scoring one goal against Laos on 18 September 2016. .He made his international debut for Indonesia U-23 on 7 June 2019 against Thailand U-23 and scored three goals against Philippines U-23 on 9 June 2019, both at 2019 Merlion Cup. Rafli was part of the Indonesia team that won silver in the 2019 Southeast Asian Games in the Philippines. He received a call to join the senior Indonesian national football team in May 2021. He earned his first senior cap in a 25 May 2021 unofficial FIFA friendly match in Dubai against Afghanistan, in which he was also the team captain.

Career statistics

Club

International

International under-23 goals

Honours

Club
Arema
 Indonesia President's Cup: 2017, 2019, 2022

International 
Indonesia U23
 Southeast Asian Games  Silver medal: 2019

Individual
 Merlion Cup Top Goalscorer: 2019 (3 goals)

References

External links
 Muhammad Rafli at Soccerway
 Muhammad Rafli at Liga Indonesia
 

1998 births
Living people
Indonesian footballers
Sportspeople from Malang
Association football forwards
Nike Academy players
Arema F.C. players
Liga 1 (Indonesia) players
Sportspeople from East Java
Indonesia youth international footballers
Indonesia international footballers
Competitors at the 2019 Southeast Asian Games
Southeast Asian Games silver medalists for Indonesia
Southeast Asian Games medalists in football
21st-century Indonesian people